The Korea National Maritime Museum (called 국립해양박물관 in Korean) is  a Korean maritime museum and the third largest museum in the Republic of Korea.  The museum was inaugurated on July 9, 2012,  and is located in Dongsam-dong, Yeongdo-gu, Busan.

The museum exhibits more than 12,000  maritime relics, including the ‘Joseon Missional Ship’ which is the largest replica in South Korea - half the size of the actual ship.

Collections 
 Ship of Joseon Envoy
 Globe and celestial globe
 Secret of Sea
 Johaengilrok
 Hamgyeong-do Coastal Map
 Juk-do Jechal

See also
Busan
Busan Marine Natural History Museum

References

External links 
 The Korea National Maritime Museum

Museums established in 2012
Museums in Busan
Maritime museums
National museums of South Korea
Transport museums in South Korea
2012 establishments in South Korea